Peter Cartwright (30 August 1935 – 18 November 2013) was a South African born British actor who made hundreds of appearances in television, film and on radio and worked extensively in the theatre, both in the provinces and London's West End.

Cartwright was born in Krugersdorp, Gauteng, South Africa, and educated at St. Andrew's College in Grahamstown. He arrived in Britain in 1959 and studied at RADA.

He was best known in South Africa for a series of television commercials in which he was the face of Charles Glass, the legendary founder of South African Breweries and the brewmaster who brewed Castle Lager. He died of cancer at his home in London on 18 November 2013, aged 78.

Selected TV credits
Softly, Softly: Taskforce, Z-Cars, Rumpole of the Bailey, Danger UXB, Yes Prime Minister, Casualty, Shackleton, Longitude, The Vicar of Dibley, Doctor Who.

He appeared in the British soap Emmerdale playing George Postlethwaite the fictional bishop of Skipdale.

Selected film credits
In Harry Potter and the Order of the Phoenix, he played a wizard, Elphias Doge, part of the Order of the Phoenix, escorting Harry to Grimmauld Place.

Other films include Wimbledon, Cry Freedom, Gandhi and The Fourth Protocol.

Filmography

Stage credits
Sleuth (Fortune Theatre, West End), Habeas Corpus (Theatre Royal, Windsor), Don Carlos (Royal Exchange, Manchester),

References

External links

1935 births
2013 deaths
Alumni of RADA
British male film actors
British male television actors
South African male film actors
Alumni of St. Andrew's College, Grahamstown
South African male television actors
20th-century British male actors
21st-century British male actors
British male stage actors
People from Krugersdorp